Henry Alexander Murray (May 13, 1893 – June 23, 1988) was an American psychologist at Harvard University, where from 1959 to 1962 he conducted a series of psychologically damaging and purposefully abusive experiments on minors and undergraduate students—one of whom was Ted Kaczynski, later known as the Unabomber. It has been suggested that Murray's work with Kaczynski helped consolidate the personal beliefs and world views that culminated in Kaczynski's later actions as the Unabomber. He was Director of the Harvard Psychological Clinic in the School of Arts and Sciences after 1930. Murray developed a theory of personality called personology, based on "need" and "press".  Murray was also a co-developer, with Christiana Morgan, of the Thematic Apperception Test (TAT), which he referred to as "the second best-seller that Harvard ever published, second only to the Harvard Dictionary of Music."

Early life and education
Murray was born in New York City into a wealthy family of Henry Alexander Murray Sr., and Fannie Morris Babcock, daughter of financier Samuel Denison Babcock. Murray had an older sister and a younger brother. Carver and Scheier note that "he got on well with his father but had a poor relationship with his mother", resulting in a deep-seated feeling of depression. They hypothesize that the disruption of this relationship led Murray to be especially aware of people's needs and their importance as underlying determinants of behavior.

After Groton School he attended Harvard University, where he majored in history while competing in football, rowing and boxing. His academic pursuits at Harvard were lacking, but at Columbia University he excelled in medicine, completed his M.D. and also received an M.A. in biology in 1919. For the following two years he was an instructor in physiology at Harvard.

He received his doctorate in biochemistry from the University of Cambridge in 1928, aged 35.

In 1916, Murray married at age 23. In 1923, after seven years of marriage, he met and fell in love with Christiana Morgan. He experienced a serious conflict as he did not want to leave his wife, Josephine. This was a turning point in Murray's life as it raised his awareness of conflicting needs, the pressure that can result, and the links to motivation. Carver and Scheier note that it was Morgan who was "fascinated by the psychology of Carl Jung" and it was as a result of her urging that he met Carl Jung in Switzerland. He described Jung as "The first full blooded, spherical—and Goethean, I would say, intelligence I had ever met." He was analyzed by him and studied his works. "The experience of bringing a problem to a psychologist and receiving an answer that seemed to work had a great impact on Murray, leading him to seriously consider psychology as a career".

Professional career
During his period at Harvard, Murray sat in on lectures by Alfred North Whitehead, whose process philosophy marked his philosophical and metaphysical thinking throughout his professional career.

In 1927, at the age of 33, Murray became assistant director of the Harvard Psychological Clinic. He developed the concepts of latent needs (not openly displayed), manifest needs (observed in people's actions), "press" (external influences on motivation) and "thema"—"a pattern of press and need that coalesces around particular interactions". 

Murray collaborated with Stanley Cobb, Bullard Professor of Neuropathology at the Medical School, to introduce psychoanalysis into the Harvard curriculum but to keep those who taught it away from the decision-making apparatus in Vienna.  He and Cobb set the stage for the founding of the Boston Psychoanalytic Society after 1931, but both were excluded from membership on political grounds.
 
In 1935, Murray and Morgan developed the concept of apperception and the assumption that everyone's thinking is shaped by subjective processes, the rationale behind the Thematic apperception test. They used the term "apperception" to refer to the process of projecting fantasy imagery onto an objective stimulus.

In 1937, Murray became director of the Harvard Psychological Clinic. 
In 1938 he published Explorations in Personality, a classic in psychology, which includes a description of the Thematic Apperception Test. 
In 1938 Murray acted as a consultant for the British Government, setting up the Officer Selection Board. Murray's work at The Harvard Psychological Clinic enabled him to apply his theories in the design of the selection processes with a "situation test", an assessment based on practical tasks and activities, an analysis of specific criteria (e.g. "leadership") by a number of raters across a range of activities. Results were pooled to achieve an overall assessment.

World War II, Office of Strategic Services, 1939–45
During World War II, he left Harvard and worked as lieutenant colonel for the Office of Strategic Services (OSS). James Miller, in charge of the selection of secret agents at the OSS during World War II, said the situation test was used by British War Officer Selection Board and OSS to assess potential agents.

In 1943 Murray helped complete Analysis of the Personality of Adolph Hitler, commissioned by OSS boss Gen. William "Wild Bill" Donovan. The report was done in collaboration with psychoanalyst Walter C. Langer, Ernst Kris, New School for Social Research, and Bertram D. Lewin, New York Psychoanalytic Institute. The report used many sources to profile Hitler, including informants such as Ernst Hanfstaengl, Hermann Rauschning, Princess Stephanie von Hohenlohe, Gregor Strasser, Friedelind Wagner, and Kurt Ludecke. The groundbreaking study was the pioneer of offender profiling and political psychology. In addition to predicting that Hitler would choose suicide if defeat for Germany was near, Murray's collaborative report stated that Hitler was impotent as far as heterosexual relations were concerned and that there was a possibility that Hitler had participated in a homosexual relationship. The report stated: "The belief that Hitler is homosexual has probably developed (a) from the fact that he does show so many feminine characteristics, and (b) from the fact that there were so many homosexuals in the Party during the early days and many continue to occupy important positions. It is probably true that Hitler calls Albert Forster 'Bubi', which is a common nickname employed by homosexuals in addressing their partners."

Harvard human experiments, 1959–62
In 1947, he returned to Harvard as a chief researcher, lectured and established with others the Psychological Clinic Annex.

From late 1959 to early 1962, Murray was responsible for unethical experiments in which he used twenty-two Harvard undergraduates as research subjects. 
Among other goals, experiments sought to measure individuals' responses to extreme stress. The unwitting undergraduates were submitted to what Murray called "vehement, sweeping and personally abusive" attacks. Specifically tailored assaults to their egos, cherished ideas, and beliefs were used to cause high levels of stress and distress. The subjects then viewed recorded footage of their reactions to this verbal abuse repeatedly.

Among the subjects was 17-year-old Ted Kaczynski, a mathematician who went on to be known as the 'Unabomber', a domestic terrorist who targeted academics and technologists for 17 years. Alston Chase's book Harvard and the Unabomber: The Education of an American Terrorist connects Kaczynski's abusive experiences under Murray to his later criminal career.

In 1960, Timothy Leary started research in psychedelic drugs at Harvard, which Murray is said to have supervised.

Some sources have suggested that Murray's experiments were part of, or indemnified by, the US Government's research into mind control known as the MKUltra project.

Retirement and death
In 1962, Murray became emeritus professor, and earned the Distinguished Scientific Contribution Award from the American Psychological Association and the Gold Medal Award for lifetime achievement from the American Psychological Foundation.

Murray died from pneumonia at the age of 95.

Murray was a leading authority on the works of American author Herman Melville and amassed a collection of books, manuscripts and artifacts relating to Melville which he donated to the Berkshire Athenaeum in Pittsfield, Massachusetts.

Personology
Murray's Theory of Personality, also called personology, is explained in his book, Explorations in Personality, written in 1938.  Murray's system of needs is an important part of the personological system. and developed while personality theory in psychology was becoming dominated by the statistics of trait theory. Personology was a holistic approach that studied the person at many levels of complexity all at the same time by an interdisciplinary team of investigators.

According to Murray's ideas, an individual's personality develops dynamically as each person responds to complex elements in her or his specific environment.  Murray viewed an individual's entire life as one unit, and pointed out that although a specific element of a person's life can be studied through psychology, this studied episode gives an incomplete picture of the entire life unit. To properly analyze the entire life cycle, Murray favored a narrative approach to studying personality, which he called "personology". The personological system has been used as an approach for multiple academic disciplines: philosophy, humanism, biological chemistry, and societal and cultural studies.

Murray divided personology into five principles: (1) Cerebral physiology, rooted in the brain, governs all aspects of personality. (2) People act to reduce physiological and psychological tension to gain satisfaction, but do not strive to be tension-free, and rather cycle between seeking excitement, activity and movement in their lives and then relaxing. (3) An individual's personality continues to develop over time and is influenced by all of the events that occur over a person's lifetime. (4) Personality is not fixed and it can change and progress, and (5) Each person has some unique characteristics and others which are shared by everyone.

Murray's theory of personality is rooted in psychoanalysis, and the chief business and aim of personology is the reconstruction of the individual's past life experiences in order to explain their present behavior. To study personality, Murray used free association and dream analysis to bring unconscious material to light. Murray's personality theories have been questioned by some psychologists, and extended by others, such as David McClelland.

Legacy
Murray's identification of psychological needs, the Murray's system of needs, including Achievement, Affiliation and Power (1938) provided the theoretical basis for the later research of David McClelland and underpins development of competency-based models of management effectiveness such as Richard Boyatzis's. McClelland, Boyatzis and Spencer went on to found the McBer Consultancy. However, Murray's contribution is rarely acknowledged in contemporary academic literature.

Explorations in Personality  underlying principles were later adopted by AT&T in the development of the Assessment Centre methodology, now widely used to assess management potential in both private and public sector organisations.

In popular culture

Manhunt: Unabomber (2017) 

Murray was portrayed by Brian d'Arcy James in Manhunt: Unabomber, the 2017 docudrama miniseries created by Andrew Sodroski, Jim Clemente and Tony Gittelson.

Selected works

Books
 Explorations in Personality, with a foreword by Dan P. McAdams. New York: Oxford University Press (1938); reissue (2008).
Assessment of Men: Selection of Personnel for the Office of Strategic Service, with OSS Selection Staff. New York: Rinehart (1948).
 Personality in Nature, Society, and Culture, with Clyde Kluckhohn. New York: Knopf (1953).
 Myth and Mythmaking. New York: G. Braziller (1960).

Articles 
 "The Effect of Fear Upon Estimates of the Maliciousness of other Personalities." Journal of Social Psychology, vol. 4, no. 3 (1933), pp. 310-329. .
 "Psychology and the University." Archives of Neurology and Psychiatry, vol. 34 (Oct. 1935). .
 "Assessment of OSS Personnel," with Donald W. MacKinnon. Journal of Consulting Psychology, vol. 10, no. 2 (1946), pp. 76-80. .
 "America's Mission." Survey Graphic, vol. 37, no. 10 (Oct. 1948), pp. 411-415. Full issue. Full audio.
 "In Nomine Diaboli." New England Quarterly, vol. 24, no. 4 (Dec. 1951), pp. 435-452. . .
 "Introduction to the Issue 'Myth and Mythmaking.'" Daedalus, vol. 88, no. 2, Special Issue: Myth and Mythmaking (Spring 1959), pp. 211-222. .
 "The Personality and Career of Satan." Journal of Social Issues, vol. 18, no. 4 (Oct. 1962), pp. 36-54. .
 "Studies of Stressful Interpersonal Disputations." American Psychologist, vol. 18, no. 1 (1963), pp. 28–36. .

Reviews 
 "This is 'Psychology'..." Review of Personality: A Biosocial Approach to Origins and Structure, by Gardner Murphy. Survey Graphic, vol. 37, no. 3 (Mar. 1948), pp. 167-168.
 Review of Anthropology and the Classics, by Clyde Kluckhohn. American Anthropologist, vol. 65, no. 1 (Feb. 1963), pp. 139-140. .
 "The Freudian Hawthorne." Review of The Sins of the Fathers: Hawthorne's Psychological Themes, by Frederick C. Crews. The American Scholar, vol. 36, no. 2 (Spring 1967), pp. 308–312. .

Contributions 
 "The Effect of Fear upon Estimates of the Maliciousness of Other Personalities in Understanding Human Motivation." In: Understanding Human Motivation, by C. L. Stacey & M. DeMartino (eds). Cleveland: Howard Allen Publishers (1958). pp. 327–342. . Abstract.
 "Historical Trends in Personality Research" (Part One: Overview). In: Perspectives in Personality Research, edited by Henry P. David and Johannes C. Brengelmann. Berlin: Springer Science+Business Media, LLC (1960). pp. 3-39. .
 Introduction to Myth and Mythmaking, by Henry A. Murray (ed). New York: G. Braziller (1960). pp. 9-17.
 "The Possible Nature of a 'Mythology' to Come" (Chapter 17). In: Myth and Mythmaking, by Henry A. Murray (ed). New York: G. Braziller (1960). pp. 300-353.

Reports 
Analysis of the Personality of Adolph Hitler: With Predictions of his Future Behavior and Suggestions for Dealing with Him Now and After Germany's Surrender. Washington: Office of Strategic Services (1943). Full text.

References

Further reading 

 Barresi, John, and Tim J. Juckes (Sep. 1997). "Personology and the Narrative Interpretation of Lives." Journal of Personality, vol. 65, no. 3. pp. 693–718.
 Fry, Franklyn D. (1953). "Manual for Scoring the Thematic Apperception Test." Journal of Psychology: Interdisciplinary and Applied, vol. 35, no. 2, pp. 181-195. .
 Hutt, Max L., and John N. Buck (1953). New York: Ronald Press Company. pp. 636–701.
 Meehl, Paul E. (Apr. 1992). "Needs (Murray, 1938) and State-variables (Skinner, 1938)." Psychological Reports, vol. 70, no. 2. pp. 407–50. .
 Millon, Theodore (2012). "On the History and Future Study of Personality and its Disorders." Annual Review of Clinical Psychology, vol. 8, pp. 1–19.
 Roazen, Paul (Feb. 2003). "Interviews on Freud and Jung with Henry A. Murray in 1965." Journal of Analytical Psychology, vol. 48, no. 1. pp. 1–2. . .
 Robinson, Forrest G. (1992). Love's Story Told: A Life of Henry A. Murray. Cambridge, MA: Harvard University Press. .
 Shneidman, Edwin S., ed. (1981) Endeavors in Psychology: Selections from the Personology of Henry A. Murray. New York: Harper-Collins. .
 Smith, M. Brewster (Oct. 1971). "Allport, Murray, and Lewin on personality theory: Notes on a confrontation." Journal of the History of the Behavioral Sciences, vol. 7. pp. 353–62. . . .
 Smith, M. Brewster (Jan. 1990). "Henry A. Murray (1893-1988): Humanistic Psychologist." Journal of Humanistic Psychology, vol. 30, no. 1, pp. 6-13. .
 "Henry Murray: Personology" (Chapter 5). In: Schultz, Duane P., and Sydney Ellen Schultz (2008). Theories of Personality, 9th ed. Boston: Cengage Learning (2008). pp. 181–203.

External links 
 Henry A. Murray at Neurotree
 TAT Research at the University of Tennessee
 Sandra K. Webster: Henry Murray at Westminster College
 Biographical profile at McGraw-Hill Education

1893 births
1988 deaths
20th-century American psychologists
Analysands of Franz Alexander
Columbia University Vagelos College of Physicians and Surgeons alumni
Harvard College alumni
Harvard University faculty
Mind control theorists
Project MKUltra
Deaths from pneumonia in Massachusetts
Human subject research in the United States
People of the Office of Strategic Services